Lyall Cameron (born 10 October 2002) is a Scottish professional footballer who plays as a midfielder for Dundee.

Career 
Cameron was put on the bench for Dundee for their final game of the 2018–19 season at home to St Mirren. Despite being due to receive his professional debut, a red card for Darren O'Dea prevented Cameron from getting on, according to manager James McPake. After scoring a game-winning goal in a friendly against Brechin City, Cameron made his professional debut for Dundee in the Scottish League Cup, coming off the bench in an away win over Raith Rovers. In January 2020, Cameron made his league debut and first professional start in a loss away to Dunfermline Athletic.

In October 2020, Cameron signed a new contract with Dundee keeping him at the club until 2023. The next day, he joined Scottish League One side Peterhead on a season-long loan, stating his aim to prove himself with The Blue Toon and help him progress to play for Dundee in the future. Cameron made his debut for Peterhead in an away win against Scottish Premiership side Dundee United in the League Cup. He made his league debut for them the next week against Airdrieonians. Cameron scored his first goal for Peterhead in their next league game the following week against Clyde. In January 2021, following the three-week suspension of League One by the SFA and SPFL due to the worsening COVID-19 situation in Scotland, Cameron was recalled by Dundee. After being recalled from Peterhead, manager Jim McInally praised Cameron's talent and professionalism, considering his spell at the club "as good as it gets when it comes to loan players."

In June 2021, Cameron would once again join Peterhead on a season-long loan. Despite this, Cameron would represent Dundee B against Peterhead in the Scottish Challenge Cup.

On 25 February 2022, Cameron would join Scottish League One side Montrose on loan until the end of the season. Cameron would score his first goal for the Gable Endies in an away victory over Falkirk. Cameron would return to Dundee at the end of Montrose's season.

On 9 July, Cameron would score his first competitive goal for Dundee in a Scottish League Cup victory over Hamilton Academical, and would do so again against Forfar Athletic two weeks later. On 30 August, Cameron would start, score and be named man of the match in a win in the same cup against Falkirk. Cameron would again notch a goal and MOTM honours the following month after scoring and playing well in a Scottish Challenge Cup victory away to Welsh champions The New Saints.

Career Statistics

References 

Scottish footballers
Dundee F.C. players
Living people
2002 births
Scottish Professional Football League players
Association football midfielders
Peterhead F.C. players
Montrose F.C. players